Franco is a rock band from the Philippines, formed in 2008. The band had its beginnings as a supergroup with members from iconic Filipino bands, consisting of Franco Reyes (InYo and Frank!) on vocals, Gabby Alipe (Urbandub) on guitar, 8 Toleran (Queso) on guitar, Buwi Meneses (Parokya ni Edgar) on bass guitar, and JanJan Mendoza (Urbandub) on drums. This original lineup disbanded in mid-2012, and regrouped with frontman Franco Reyes backed by Paul Cañada on guitar, Dave Delfin on bass and Victor Guison on drums.

History
Franco started as a collaboration project between Alipe, Toleran, Meneses and Mendoza, who are prominent musicians in the Pinoy rock scene. In late 2008, deciding to have a front man for their project band, Alipe, Mendoza, Toleran and Meneses collaborated with Reyes, who had returned to the Philippines from a stay in the U.S., thus completing the band, Franco. In 2009, they recorded songs that comprised Franco's first album. Upon the release of the first album in 2010, their songs quickly became hits and topped the charts. The band dominated the 2010 NU Rock Awards with 4 awards and 9 nominations. They were also nominated and won an award in the 2010 Awit Awards. However, in 2012, Alipe, Meneses, Toleran and Mendoza left the group, with Franco Reyes persisting to continue. Recruiting former bandmates from Cebu, Franco, now a principal act, released his sophomore studio album in 2013, entitled Soul Adventurer. Franco now tours with new members, namely Paul Cañada, Dave Delfin  and Victor Guison.

Music
Franco's musical roots are traced to a Cebu-based band named Frank!, formed by Reyes in 1996, which is credited for having boosted the Cebu rock scene. However, despite reggae-leaning songs originally composed by Reyes for Frank!, the latter music of Franco became considerably heavier. Two Franco songs — “Touch the Sky” and “Song for the Suspect — have Rastafarian messages.

Mainstream success
In 2010, they released their self-titled full-length album under MCA Music. Music videos for “Cast Away” and “This Gathering” were aired on the Filipino music channel, Myx.
Franco also dominated the 2010 NU Rock Awards by winning four awards—Artist of the Year, Song of the Year for “This Gathering”, Album of the Year for their self-titled album, and the Listeners' Choice Award. The supergroup also won an award during the 2010 Awit Awards as the Best Performance By A Group Of Recording Artists - "Castaway", and was also nominated for the Best Performance By A New Group Of Recording Artists - "Castaway" and Best Rock/Alternative - "Castaway".  The band was nominated numerous times for the MYX Music Awards.

In mid-2012, four of the members (Alipe, Toleran, Meneses and Mendoza) announced a parting of ways to focus on their own respective bands. Franco Reyes decided to retain the entity by collaborating with former colleagues from Cebu, thereby recording the second Franco album.

In 2013, Soul Adventurer was released as the band's second album. With the new lineup on board, the group won Best Alternative Recording (Awit Awards) for the song Better Days. 

On November 9, 2014, Franco launched an EP, titled Frank!, at the St. James Power Station in Sentosa, Singapore.

Band members
Current members
Franco Reyes – lead vocals, guitar (2008–present)
Paul "Poldo" Cañada – guitar (2012–present)
Dave Delfin – bass (2012–present)
Victor Guison – drums (2012–present)

Former members 
Gabby Alipe – guitar, vocals (2008–2012)
Paolo "8"/"Ocho" Toleran – guitar (2008–2012)
JanJan Mendoza – drums (2008–2012)
Buwi Meneses – bass (2008–2012)

Discography

Studio Album
 Franco (2010)
 Soul Adventurer (2013)
 Flight (2018)

EP
 Frank! (2014)

Track listing

Franco (2010)

Soul Adventurer (2013)

Flight (2018)

Awards and nominations

References

External links
 Facebook Page

Cebuano rock bands
Filipino rock music groups
Musical groups established in 2009
Musical groups from Cebu
Musical groups from Metro Manila
MCA Music Inc. (Philippines) artists